Episesarma is a genus of swimming crabs species in the family Sesarmidae.

Species 
 Episesarma chentongense (Serène & Soh, 1967)
 Episesarma crebrestriatum (Tesch, 1917)
 Episesarma lafondii (Hombron & Jacquinot, 1846)
 Episesarma mederi (H. Milne Edwards, 1853)
 Episesarma palawanense (Rathbun, 1914)
 Episesarma singaporense (Tweedie, 1936)
 Episesarma versicolor (Tweedie, 1940)

References 

Crabs